Harry Max Markowitz (born August 24, 1927) is an American economist who received the 1989 John von Neumann Theory Prize and the 1990 Nobel Memorial Prize in Economic Sciences.

Markowitz is a professor of finance at the Rady School of Management at the University of California, San Diego (UCSD).  He is best known for his pioneering work in modern portfolio theory, studying the effects of asset risk, return, correlation and diversification on probable investment portfolio returns.

Biography
Harry Markowitz was born to a Jewish family, the son of Morris and Mildred Markowitz. During high school, Markowitz developed an interest in physics and philosophy, in particular the ideas of David Hume, an interest he continued to follow during his undergraduate years at the University of Chicago. After receiving his Ph.B. in Liberal Arts, Markowitz decided to continue his studies at the University of Chicago, choosing to specialize in economics. There he had the opportunity to study under important economists, including Milton Friedman, Tjalling Koopmans, Jacob Marschak and Leonard Savage. While still a student, he was invited to become a member of the Cowles Commission for Research in Economics, which was in Chicago at the time. He completed his A.M. in Economics from the university in 1950.

Markowitz chose to apply mathematics to the analysis of the stock market as the topic for his dissertation. Jacob Marschak, who was the thesis advisor, encouraged him to pursue the topic, noting that it had also been a favorite interest of Alfred Cowles, the founder of the Cowles Commission. While researching the then current understanding of stock prices, which at the time consisted in the present value model of John Burr Williams, Markowitz realized that the theory lacks an analysis of the impact of risk. This insight led to the development of his seminal theory of portfolio allocation under uncertainty, published in 1952 by the Journal of Finance.

In 1952, Harry Markowitz went to work for the RAND Corporation, where he met George Dantzig. With Dantzig's help, Markowitz continued to research optimization techniques, further developing the critical line algorithm for the identification of the optimal mean-variance portfolios, relying on what was later named the Markowitz frontier. In 1954, he received a PhD in Economics from the University of Chicago with a thesis on the portfolio theory. The topic was so novel that, while Markowitz was defending his dissertation, Milton Friedman argued his contribution was not economics. During 1955–1956 Markowitz spent a year at the Cowles Foundation, which had moved to Yale University, at the invitation of James Tobin. He published the critical line algorithm in a 1956 paper and used this time at the foundation to write a book on portfolio allocation which was published in 1959.

Markowitz won the Nobel Memorial Prize in Economic Sciences in 1990 while a professor of finance at Baruch College of the City University of New York.  In the preceding year, he received the John von Neumann Theory Prize from the Operations Research Society of America (now Institute for Operations Research and the Management Sciences, INFORMS) for his contributions in the theory of three fields: portfolio theory; sparse matrix methods; and simulation language programming (SIMSCRIPT). Sparse matrix methods are now widely used to solve very large systems of simultaneous equations whose coefficients are mostly zero. SIMSCRIPT has been widely used to program computer simulations of manufacturing, transportation, and computer systems as well as war games. SIMSCRIPT (I) included the Buddy memory allocation method, which was also developed by Markowitz.
He was elected to the 2002 class of Fellows of the Institute for Operations Research and the Management Sciences.

CACI
The company that would become CACI International was founded by Herb Karr and Harry Markowitz on July 17, 1962 as California Analysis Center, Inc.  They helped develop SIMSCRIPT, the first simulation programming language, at RAND and after it was released to the public domain, CACI was founded to provide support and training for SIMSCRIPT.

In 1968, Markowitz joined Arbitrage Management company founded by Michael Goodkin. Working with Paul Samuelson and Robert Merton he created a hedge fund that represents the first known attempt at computerized arbitrage trading. He took over as chief executive in 1970. After a successful run as a private hedge fund, AMC was sold to Stuart & Co. in 1971. A year later, Markowitz left the company.

Years later, he was involved with CACI's SIMSCRIPT addition of Object-oriented features.

Post-CACI
Markowitz divides his time between teaching (he is an adjunct professor at the Rady School of Management at the University of California at San Diego, UCSD); video casting lectures; and consulting (out of his Harry Markowitz Company offices). He currently serves on the Advisory Board of SkyView Investment Advisors, a traditional and alternative investment advisory firm. Markowitz also serves on the Investment Committee of LWI Financial Inc. ("Loring Ward"), a San Jose, California-based investment advisor; on the advisory panel of Robert D. Arnott's Newport Beach, California based investment management firm, Research Affiliates; on the Advisory Board of Mark Hebner's Irvine, California and internet based investment advisory firm, Index Fund Advisors; and as an advisor to the Investment Committee of 1st Global, a Dallas, Texas-based wealth management and investment advisory firm. Markowitz advises and serves on the board of ProbabilityManagement.org, a 501(c)(3) non-profit that aims "to reshape the communication and calculation of uncertainty."

Markowitz is co-founder and Chief Architect of GuidedChoice, a 401(k) managed accounts provider and investment advisor. Markowitz's more recent work has included designing the backbone software analytics for the GuidedChoice investment solution and heading the GuidedChoice Investment Committee. He is actively involved in designing the next step in the retirement process: assisting retirees with wealth distribution through GuidedSpending.

Research
A Markowitz-efficient portfolio is one where diversification can lower the portfolio's risk for a given return expectation (alternately, no additional expected return can be gained without increasing the risk of the portfolio). The Markowitz Efficient Frontier is the set of all portfolios that will give the highest expected return for each given level of risk.  These concepts of efficiency were essential to the development of the capital asset pricing model.

Markowitz also co-edited the textbook The Theory and Practice of Investment Management with Frank J. Fabozzi of Yale School of Management. In the same line, Markowitz is part of the Editorial Board of AESTIMATIO, the IEB International Journal of Finance.

Selected publications
 
 
 
  (reprinted by Yale University Press, 1970, ; 2nd ed. Basil Blackwell, 1991)

See also
 List of economists
 List of Jewish Nobel laureates
 Risk management tools

References

External links

 
 Harry Markowitz: Videos of Interviews by Mark Hebner and Weston Wellington and Presentations by Professor Markowitz
 The Sveriges Riksbank Prize in Economic Sciences in Memory of Alfred Nobel, 1990
 
 Banquet Speech, December 10, 1990
 Nobel Prize Lecture: Foundations of Portfolio Theory, December 7, 1990 ( PDF format)
 Oral history interview with Harry M. Markowitz,  Charles Babbage Institute, University of Minnesota – Markowitz discusses his development of portfolio theory, sparse matrices, and his work at the RAND Corporation and elsewhere on simulation software development (including computer language SIMSCRIPT), modeling, and operations research.
 History of Finance, interviews, The American Finance Association
 Guide to the Harry M. Markowitz Papers 1963, 1965, 1967
 Adjunct Professor of Finance, bio , Rady School of Management, University of California at San Diego
 1st Global Engages Dr. Harry M. Markowitz, 1st Global
 
 http://people.maths.ox.ac.uk/~zhouxy/download/mvjump_part2.pdf 
 http://home.dacor.net/norton/finance-math/problems_w_Markowitz.pdf
 Biography of Harry Markowitz from the Institute for Operations Research and the Management Sciences

1927 births
Living people
Nobel laureates in Economics
American Nobel laureates
Economists from California
Baruch College faculty
University of California, San Diego faculty
Jewish American scientists
University of Chicago alumni
Fellows of the Econometric Society
John von Neumann Theory Prize winners
RAND Corporation people
Jewish American economists
Financial economists
Fellows of the American Academy of Arts and Sciences
Fellows of the Institute for Operations Research and the Management Sciences
Presidents of the American Finance Association